Plebeius may refer to:

The gossamer-winged butterfly genus Plebejus
A member of the Plebs.